Calydiscoides euzeti is a species of monogenean of the family Diplectanidae.

As all members of the family Diplectanidae, it has a single posterior testis and a single ovary that wraps the lateral caecum of the intestine. 
As all members of the genus Calydiscoides, it is characterized by the presence of lamellodiscs, which are specialized attachment organs made up of concentric lamellae, on the posterior part of its body. 

The species is distinguished from other species of the genus Calydiscoides by the shape and size of its male copulatory organ, which is elongate in shape with an anterior curved whip, and 70–83 μm in length.

It is ectoparasite on the gills of two species of marine fish, emperors, namely the Spotcheek emperor Lethrinus rubrioperculatus and the Yellowlip emperor Lethrinus xanthochilus. It has been found off New Caledonia, in the South Pacific Ocean.

The name of the species, euzeti, means that it was named in honour of Professor Louis Euzet, a famous French parasitologist.

References

Diplectanidae
New Caledonia
Animals described in 2007